The following is a list of Portuguese films that were first released in 2017.

Highest-grossing films 
The following is a list of the 10 highest-grossing domestic films in Portugal that were first released in 2017, as of December 20, 2017, according to the Instituto do Cinema e do Audiovisual (Institute of Cinema and Audiovisual).

List of films

See also 

 2017 in Portugal

References 

Lists of Portuguese films by year
Lists of 2017 films by country or language
2017 in Portugal